
Gmina Moszczenica is a rural gmina (administrative district) in Piotrków County, Łódź Voivodeship, in central Poland.

Villages
Gmina Moszczenica contains the villages and settlements of Baby, Białkowice, Dąbrówka, Gajkowice, Gazomka, Gościmowice Drugie, Gościmowice Drugie-Powęziny, Gościmowice Pierwsze, Jarosty, Karlin, Kiełczówka, Kosów, Michałów, Moszczenica, Moszczenica-Osiedle, Moszczenica-Wola, Nowa Gazomia, Podolin, Pomyków, Raciborowice, Raków, Raków Duży, Rękoraj, Sierosław, Srock and Stara Gazomia.

Neighbouring gminas
Gmina Moszczenica is bordered by the city of Piotrków Trybunalski and by the gminas of Będków, Czarnocin, Grabica, Tuszyn and Wolbórz.

References
 Polish official population figures 2006

Moszczenica
Piotrków County